The 2017 European Badminton Championships were the 26th tournament of the European Badminton Championships. They were held in Kolding, Denmark, from 25–30 April 2017.

Medalists

Medal table

Men's singles

Seeds

  Viktor Axelsen (semifinals)
  Rajiv Ouseph (champion)
  Marc Zwiebler (quarterfinals)
  Hans-Kristian Vittinghus (semifinals)
  Anders Antonsen (final)
  Pablo Abián (third round)
  Brice Leverdez (quarterfinals)
  Fabian Roth (quarterfinals)

Wild card
Badminton Europe (BEC) awarded a wild card entry to Toma Junior Popov of France.

Section 1

Section 2

Section 3

Section 4

Finals

Women's singles

Seeds

  Carolina Marín (champion)
  Beatriz Corrales (third round)
  Linda Zetchiri (third round)
  Line Kjaersfeldt (quarterfinals)
  Mette Poulsen (semifinals)
  Sabrina Jaquet (semifinals)
  Kirsty Gilmour (final)
  Natalia Koch Rohde (quarterfinals)

Wild card
Badminton Europe (BEC) awarded a wild card entry to Yvonne Li of Germany.

Section 1

Section 2

Section 3

Section 4

Finals

Men's doubles

Seeds

  Mathias Boe / Carsten Mogensen (champion)
  Mads Conrad-Petersen / Mads Pieler Kolding (final)
  Kim Astrup / Anders Skaarup Rasmussen (semifinals)
  Vladimir Ivanov / Ivan Sozonov (quarterfinals)
  Marcus Ellis / Chris Langridge (quarterfinals)
  Mathias Christiansen / David Daugaard (semifinals)
  Jones Ralfy Jansen / Josche Zurwonne (quarterfinals)
  Matijs Dierickx / Freek Golinski (quarterfinals)

Top half

Bottom half

Finals

Women's doubles

Seeds

  Kamilla Rytter Juhl / Christinna Pedersen (champion)
  Gabriela Stoeva / Stefani Stoeva (final)
  Maiken Fruergaard / Sara Thygesen (quarterfinals)
  Anastasia Chervyakova / Olga Morozova (semifinals)
  Eefje Muskens / Selena Piek (quarterfinals)
  Julie Finne-Ipsen / Rikke Søby (quarterfinals)
  Lauren Smith / Sarah Walker (semifinals)
  Mariya Mitsova / Petya Nedelcheva (quarterfinals)

Top half

Bottom half

Finals

Mixed doubles

Seeds

  Joachim Fischer Nielsen / Christinna Pedersen (final)
  Chris Adcock / Gabrielle Adcock (champion)
  Mathias Christiansen / Sara Thygesen (quarterfinals)
  Robert Mateusiak / Nadiezda Zieba (quarterfinals)
  Jacco Arends / Selena Piek (first round)
  Evgenij Dremin / Evgenia Dimova (quarterfinals)
  Vitalij Durkin / Nina Vislova (second round)
  Nico Ruponen / Amanda Hogstrom (quarterfinals)

Wild card
Badminton Europe (BEC) awarded a wild card entry to Søren Gravholt and Maiken Fruergaard of Denmark.

Top half

Bottom half

Finals

External links
Official website

References

European Badminton Championships
European Badminton Championships
International sports competitions hosted by Denmark
2017 in Danish sport
Badminton tournaments in Denmark